Tianqi Lithium Corp (previously Sichuan Tianqi Lithium Industries, Inc.) is a Chinese mining and manufacturing company based in Sichuan.

As of 2018, the company controls more 46% of the production of lithium worldwide.

Production

World production of lithium via spodumene was around 80,000 metric tonnes per annum in 2018, primarily from the Greenbushes pegmatite of Western Australia and from some Chinese and Chilean sources. The Talison mine in Greenbushes, Western Australia, is reported to be the 2nd largest and to have the highest grade of ore at 2.4% Li2O (2012 figures).

Acquisitions
Tianqi has owned a 51% ownership stake in Talison Lithium, which operates the Greenbushes mine in Australia, since 2009. Tianqi announced in 2018 that it would invest US$600 million to construct a lithium processing plant in Kwinana, Western Australia.

In 2018, Tianqi acquired a 24% stake in the Chilean mining company Sociedad Química y Minera (SQM) for approximately $4.1 billion. Tianqi was to purchase 62.5 million SQM A shares for $65 each from Canadian fertilizer company Nutrien.

Tianqi is currently in a legal dispute with MSP Engineering over the payment for building the lithium hydroxide plant in Kwinana Western Australia. MSP claim that Tianqi have failed to meet scheduled payments totalling over $39 million. A WA Supreme Court order handed down an order giving Tianqi seven days to pay MSP almost $39 million, something that Tianqi has refused to do, seeking a stay on the judgement. The matter is still before the courts.

Carbon footprint
Tianqi Lithium Corp reported Total CO2e emissions (Direct + Indirect) for 31 December 2020 at 259 Kt.

See also

 Lithium
 Spodumene
 Ganfeng Lithium
 Sociedad Química y Minera
 Talison Lithium
 List of countries by lithium production

References

External links

Companies listed on the Shenzhen Stock Exchange
Companies listed on the Hong Kong Stock Exchange
Companies based in Sichuan
Chengdu
Metal companies of China
Civilian-run enterprises of China
Companies established in 1995
2010 initial public offerings
2022 initial public offerings
H shares
Manufacturing companies of China
Lithium mining
Lithium